The Ministry of Mining Department is a Ministry of the Government of Maharashtra. 
state.

The Ministry is headed by a cabinet level Minister. Dadaji Bhuse is Current Minister of Mining Department Government of Maharashtra.

Head office

List of Cabinet Ministers

List of Ministers of State

References

Government ministries of Maharashtra
Subnational mining ministries